Luca Robert Colville (born 17 July 1999) is an English professional footballer who plays for Scarborough Athletic, as a winger. He has previously played for Bradford City and Greenock Morton.

Career
Colville joined Huddersfield Town at the under-11 age group, turning professional in February 2017. He trialled with Sheffield United and Nottingham Forest in 2018. After a trial with the club, Colville signed a one-year contract with Bradford City on 14 August 2018. He scored on his debut later that same day, in an EFL Cup game.

In May 2019, following Bradford City's relegation to League Two, he was one of 3 first-team players to be offered a new contract by the club. In July 2019, City manager Gary Bowyer revealed that Colville was still considering whether to accept the offer or not. At the start of the 2019–20 season Colville remained with the club on a weekly contract. He made his first appearance in the 2019–20 season on 13 August 2019, in the EFL Cup.

On 23 August 2019, Colville signed a two-year deal with Scottish Championship club Greenock Morton, transferring for an undisclosed fee.

He returned to England in October 2021, signing for Scarborough Athletic.

Career statistics

References

1999 births
Living people
English footballers
Association football wingers
Huddersfield Town A.F.C. players
Bradford City A.F.C. players
Greenock Morton F.C. players
Scarborough Athletic F.C. players
English Football League players
Scottish Professional Football League players
Northern Premier League players